Nicholson Station was opened on Monday 10 April 1916 as part of the Orbost railway line and closed on Monday 24 August 1987.

Little trace remains of the station site, however a station name board exists at the site as part of the East Gippsland Rail Trail, which follows the route of the former rail line.

Gallery

References

Disused railway stations in Victoria (Australia)
Transport in Gippsland (region)
Shire of East Gippsland